Diloma concameratum, common name the speckled periwinkle, is a species of sea snail, a marine gastropod mollusk in the family Trochidae, the top snails.

Description
The height of the shell varies between 15 mm and 27 mm, the diameter between 23 mm and 25 mm. The very thick and solid, imperforate shell has a globose-conical shape and is generally rather depressed. Its color is yellow and black, tessellated or longitudinally striped, sometimes the black, sometimes the yellow predominating. The spire is a very short cone. The apex is usually perfect and acute, often ruddy. The five whorls are slightly convex. The increase very rapidly in size. They are spirally strongly costate, the ridges 13 or 14 in number on the last whorl . The body whorl slightly descends at the aperture and is not eroded on the base. The large aperture is oblique. The outer lip is margined within with yellow and black, followed by a nacreous and then by an opaque white thickening which more or less contracts the aperture and which is more or less notched at about the place of the periphery. The columella is white, much narrower than in Diloma aethiops. It is bidenticulate below.

The more prominent characters of this species are the strong spiral ribs and the thick outer layer of yellow and purplish-black, or of black veined with yellow, which usually assumes a tessellated pattern. Sometimes, however, the black predominates to the almost entire exclusion of yellow, and specimens also occur in which the
black is scarcely visible on the surface.

Distribution
This marine species is endemic to Australia and occurs off New South Wales, South Australia, Tasmania, Victoria and Western Australia

References

 Quoy, J.R. & Gaimard, J.P. 1834. Voyage de Découvertes de l'Astrolabe exécuté par Ordre du Roi, Pendant les Années 1826-1829. Paris : J. Tastu Zoologie Vol. 3 366 pp
 Deshayes, G.P. 1843. Histoire naturelle des animaux sans vertèbres. Paris : J.B. Baillière Vol. 9 728 pp
 Philippi, R.A. 1845. Abbildungen und Beschriebungen neuer oder wenig gekannter Conchylien. Cassel : Theodor Fischer 40 pp.
 Forbes, E. 1852. On the Mollusca collected by Mr MacGillivray during the voyage of the Rattlesnake. pp. 360–386 in MacGillivray, J. (ed). Narrative of the Voyage of H.M.S. Rattlesnake, commanded by the late Captain Owen Stanley, R.N., F.R.S. etc., during the years 1846-1850. London : Lords Commissioners of the Admiralty Vol. II 395 pp.
 Adams, A. 1853. Contributions towards a monograph of the Trochidae, a family of gastropodous Mollusca. Proceedings of the Zoological Society of London 1851(19): 150-192
 Angas, G.F. 1865. On the marine molluscan fauna of the Province of South Australia, with a list of all the species known up to the present time, together with remarks on their habitats and distribution, etc. Proceedings of the Zoological Society of London 1865: 155-"180" 
 Angas, G.F. 1867. List of species of marine Mollusca found in Port Jackson Harbour, New South Wales, and on the adjacent coasts, with notes on their habits, etc. Part 1. Proceedings of the Zoological Society of London 1867: 185-233 
 Troschel, F.H. 1879. Das Gebiss der Schnecken, zur Begründung einer Natürlichen Classification [by J. Thiele, written after Troschel's death]. Berlin : Nicolaische Verlagsbuchhandlung Vol. II 237 pp
 Watson, R.B. 1885: Zoology. Vol. XV(II). 50 pls, 756
 Watson, R.B. 1886. Report on the Scaphopoda and Gastropoda collected by the H.M.S. "Challenger" during the years 1873-1876. Report on the Scientific Results of the Voyage of H.M.S. Challenger 1873–1876, Zoology 15(42): 756 pp., 50 pls
 Pilsbry, H.A. 1889. Manual of Conchology. Philadelphia : Academy of Natural Sciences Philadelphia Vol. 11 519 pp.,
 Hedley, C. 1917. Studies on Australian Mollusca. Part XIII. Proceedings of the Linnean Society of New South Wales 41: 680-719
 Hedley, C. 1918. A checklist of the marine fauna of New South Wales. Part 1. Journal and Proceedings of the Royal Society of New South Wales 51: M1-M120
 May, W.L. 1921. A Checklist of the Mollusca of Tasmania. Hobart, Tasmania : Government Printer 114 pp
 May, W.L. 1923. An Illustrated Index of Tasmanian Shells. Hobart : Government Printer 100 pp.
 Thiele, J. 1930. Gastropoda und Bivalvia. pp. 561–596 in Michaelsen, W. & Hartmayer, R. (eds). Die Fauna Südwest-Australiens. Jena : Gustav Fischer Vol. 5.
 Cotton, B.C. & Godfrey, F.K. 1934. South Australian Shells. Part 13. South Australian Naturalist 1 16: 1-6
 Allan, J.K. 1950. Australian Shells: with related animals living in the sea, in freshwater and on the land. Melbourne : Georgian House xix, 470 pp., 45 pls, 112 text figs.
 Cotton, B.C. 1959. South Australian Mollusca. Archaeogastropoda. Handbook of the Flora and Fauna of South Australia. Adelaide : South Australian Government Printer 449 pp.
 Iredale, T. & McMichael, D.F. 1962. A reference list of the marine Mollusca of New South Wales. Memoirs of the Australian Museum 11: 1-109
 Macpherson, J.H. & Gabriel, C.J. 1962. Marine Molluscs of Victoria. Melbourne : Melbourne University Press & National Museum of Victoria 475 pp
 Wilson, B. 1993. Australian Marine Shells. Prosobranch Gastropods. Kallaroo, Western Australia : Odyssey Publishing Vol. 1 408 pp.
 Wilson, B. 2002. A Handbook to Australian Seashells on Seashores East to West and North to South. Sydney : Reed New Holland 185 pp

External links
 To Encyclopedia of Life
 To GenBank (8 nucleotides; 5 proteins)
 To World Register of Marine Species
 

concameratum
Gastropods described in 1828